José Agüero (born 27 February 1933), also known as Pepe Agüero, is a Brazilian former tennis player.

A native of Rio de Janeiro, Agüero is the son of a Chilean tennis instructor and was originally a swimmer, before switching to tennis as a teenager. His game was built on stamina and he was a good retriever of the ball.

Agüero played collegiate tennis for Tulane University and won the 1955 NCAA singles championship, defeating Bill Quillian in the final. He won four Southeastern Conference singles titles in singles and a further four in doubles.

From 1955 to 1957 he played for the Brazil Davis Cup team.

See also
List of Brazil Davis Cup team representatives

References

External links
 
 
 

1933 births
Living people
Brazilian male tennis players
Tulane Green Wave men's tennis players
Brazilian people of Chilean descent
Sportspeople from Rio de Janeiro (city)